Atlantrix is a fantasy roleplaying, play-by-mail game. First published by Atlantrix in 1984, it was later published by Battle-Magic Gaming.

History and development
Atlantrix is a fantasy roleplaying, play-by-mail game. It was hand-moderated, and open-ended. First published in 1984, in 1986, Atlantrix published the game, and as of 1990, the publisher was Battle-Magic Gaming.

Gameplay
The game's setting is a city called Atlantrix situated on an island. Gameplay starts with customizable characters of little experience, skill, money, and energy with some basic equipment. Character traits included Accuracy, Balance and Coordination, Intelligence, Social Appeal, Speed, Strength, and Timing and Reaction.

Dueling is central to advancement. Although everyone starts as a fighter, magic user classes are available as players rise in stature. Besides city exploration, dungeons and caves are available to players.

Reception
In 1986, Atlantrix tied for 10th place in Paper Mayhem's Best PBM Game of 1986 list. Robert Woodard reviewed the game in a 1996 issue of Paper Mayhem, noting that of the PBM games he played in the previous seven years, "Atlantra is one of the best".

See also
 List of play-by-mail games

Notes

References

Bibliography

 
 
 
 
 

Multiplayer games
Play-by-mail games